Skotte Jacobsson (24 February 1888 – 8 October 1964) was a Swedish track and field athlete who competed in the 1912 Summer Olympics. During that competition, he finished 17th in the triple jump competition. In the 100 metres event he was eliminated in the first round and in the 200 metres event he was eliminated in the semi-finals. In the decathlon competition he retired after four event.

References

External links
Profile

1888 births
1964 deaths
Swedish male sprinters
Swedish male triple jumpers
Swedish decathletes
Olympic athletes of Sweden
Athletes (track and field) at the 1912 Summer Olympics
Olympic decathletes